Heppnerographa brasiliana is a species of moth of the family Tortricidae. It is found in Brazil.

The wingspan is about 13 mm. The forewings are almost entirely yellowish ferruginous, but darker near the middle of the costa and yellowish beyond this suffusion. The hindwings are brown.

References

Moths described in 1999
Heppnerographa